Stolno  is a village in Chełmno County, Kuyavian-Pomeranian Voivodeship, in north-central Poland. It is the seat of the gmina (administrative district) called Gmina Stolno. It is located in Chełmno Land within the historic region of Pomerania.

The village has a population of 830.

There are several bunkers and forts from World War I in Stolno.

Transport
Stolno is located at the intersection of Polish National roads 55 and 91 and the Voivodeship road 548.

References

Villages in Chełmno County